Baikunthpur Assembly constituency is an assembly constituency in Dighwa Dubauli locality of Gopalganj district in the Indian state of Bihar.

Overview
As per Delimitation of Parliamentary and Assembly constituencies Order, 2008, No. 99 Baikunthpur Assembly constituency is composed of the following: Baikunthpur and Sidhwalia community development blocks; Rampur, Salempur Purvi, Salempur Paschimi, Hasanpur, Sadaua, Pipra and Khajuriya gram panchayats of Barauli CD Block.

Baikunthpur Assembly constituency is part of No. 17 Gopalganj (Lok Sabha constituency) (SC).

Members of Legislative Assembly

^ denotes by-polls

Election results

2020

1977-2015
In the 2020 state assembly election, Manjeet Kumar Singh In the 2015 state assembly elections, Mithlesh Tiwari of Bharatiya Janata Party won the Baikunthpur assembly seat defeating his nearest rival Manjeet Kumar Singh  of Janata Dal (United). Contests in most years were multi cornered but only winners and runners up are being mentioned. In 2010 Manjeet Kumar Singh defeated Devdatt Prasad of Rashtriya Janata Dal by a big margin. Going past election Devdatt Prasad of RJD defeated Manjeet Kumar Singh of JD(U) in October 2005 and February 2005. Manjeet Kumar Singh of JD(U) defeated Lal Babu Prasad Yadav of RJD in 2000. Lal Babu Prasad Yadav of JD defeated former Bihar Cabinet Minister Braj Kishor Narayan Singh of Congress in 1995. Shri Braj Kishor Narayan Singh of Congress defeated Devdatt Prasad of JD in 1990 and Deodat Rai of LD in 1985. Braj Kishor Narayan Singh representing Janata Party (JP) defeated Deodat Rai of Janata Party (Secular – Charan Singh) in 1980. Braj Kishor Narayan Singh representing JP defeated Deonandan Singh of CPI in 1977.

References

External links
 

Assembly constituencies of Bihar
Politics of Gopalganj district, India